Phonogram is a comic book written by Kieron Gillen and drawn by Jamie McKelvie. It is published by American company Image Comics.

Publication history
The first volume, Rue Britannia, began in August 2006 and stars David Kohl, a mage who uses the medium of Britpop music to interpret his magic.

The second volume, The Singles Club, consists of seven one-shots looking at young phonomancers and their experiences over one night at a dance club. Each issue consists of a 16-page main story, rounded-out with features and back-up stories.

Gillen originally ruled out a third volume because sales were just too low:

However, in February 2012 at the 2012 Image Expo, a third series of Phonogram was announced, entitled The Immaterial Girl. On the subject of the change of heart, Gillen stated: 

After further delays while Gillen and McKelvie launched The Wicked + The Divine, The Immaterial Girl was announced at the 2015 Image Expo as to be published in August 2015, with the last issue published in January 2016.

Gillen has strongly implied there will be no further volumes beyond The Immaterial Girl in interviews and his workblog; however, he stated there would not be a third volume at the end of The Singles Club.

Volume 1: Rue Britannia 

The first volume was a six-issue run, collected under the title Rue Britannia. In keeping with the Britpop theme, the six individual issues and the collection had cover art based on album artwork from that era.

At the end of each issue, and somewhat shortened in the trade paperback, the creators give a glossary of the more obscure phrases and pop-culture references used, as well as musings on the history of Britpop and the influences on the book.

Synopsis
Phonomancer David Kohl has to save his Britpop goddess, Britannia, who is missing. Cursed by a goddess, he follows a series of leads and meets with other 'mancers, and spends time with a "normal" friend, Kid-With-Knife. He eventually locates Britannia.

Volume 2: The Singles Club

Once more, a glossary is included in both the issues and the trade collection. The trade also includes the track list that is playing in the club scenes.

The first print of issue 5 was recalled due to it having been printed with the bar code from issue 4. The second print corrected the error.

Synopsis
Several phonomancers center on a club, where magic is discouraged. Each issue focuses on a different phonomancer, with David Kohl returning as a supporting character throughout. David's coven leader, Emily Aster, is the focus of one issue, wherein she struggles with her dual personality.

Volume 3: The Immaterial Girl

The third volume, The Immaterial Girl was announced in March 2012 for a 2012 publication, but due to the creators starting to work on Young Avengers, it was delayed until the second half of 2013: however, with the creators moving on to The Wicked + The Divine in 2014, there were no further updates until 2015 when a publication of August 2015 was confirmed as a six-issue run.

{| class="wikitable"
|-
!Issue Number
!Issue Title
!Influence
|-
|1
|Plan B
|Duran Duran and the art of Patrick Nagel
|-
|2
|Girl Anachronism
| The video for Take On Me – A-ha
|-
|3
|"I" Falls Apart
| The videos for Total Eclipse of the Heart – Bonnie Tyler and Material Girl - Madonna
|-
|4
|(Let's Make This) Precious Little Life|Scott Pilgrim vol. 1 – Bryan Lee O'Malley
|-
|5
|Losing My Edge| The video for Money for Nothing – Dire Straits
|-
|6
|See Emily Play|Don't Give Up – Peter Gabriel and Kate Bush
|-
|TPB collecting issues 1–6
|The Immaterial Girl|n/a
|-
|}

As with the previous volumes, a glossary is included in both the issues and the trade collection.

Synopsis

Continuing from the Aster-centric issue of The Singles Club, The Immaterial Girl is focused on coven leader Emily Aster's struggle with her dual-personality and identity crisis, and was foreshadowed in Issue 3 of volume 2.

Collected editions
The three limited series have been collected as trade paperbacks:Volume 1: Rue Britannia (144 pages, Image Comics, June 2007)Volume 2: The Singles Club (160 pages, Image Comics, December 2009)Volume 3: The Immaterial Girl (168 pages, Image Comics, March 2016)

There is also a one volume, complete edition hardcover::The Complete Phonogram HC'' (504 pages, Image Comics, May 2017)
Collects Phonogram #1-6, Phonogram 2: The Singles Club #1-7, Phonogram 3: The Immaterial Girl #1-6, and Previously Single-Exclusive B-Sides

Notes

References

External links

Review of trade paperback, Comics Bulletin
Phonogram covers

Interviews
 Magical Music For The Masses: Phonogram, Newsarama, July 2006
 Alternate Cover Special : Phonogram Interview, May 20, 2007

2006 comics debuts